Hassam v Jacobs NO and Others, an important case in South African law, was heard in the Constitutional Court on 19 February 2009, with judgment handed down on 15 July. The applicant was a party to a polygamous Muslim marriage, whose husband had died intestate. The Constitutional Court held that precluding the applicant from inheriting unfairly discriminated on the grounds of religion, marital status and gender, and was therefore inconsistent with section 9 of the Constitution. Accordingly, it was held that the applicant could inherit. The ambit of this judgment extended the ruling in Daniels v Campbell to polygamous Muslim marriages.

Facts 
The question was whether or not the benefits provided by the Intestate Succession Act) and the Maintenance Act accrue to surviving spouses of polygynous Muslim marriages. The objective of the legislation is to ensure that widows receive at least a child's share of their spouse's estates instead of being left precariously dependent on family benevolence.

The Cape High Court found the Intestate Succession Act, in discriminating on grounds of gender and religion and marital status, to be inconsistent with the Constitution. The word "spouse" in the Act should be interpreted henceforth to include partners in polygynous Muslim marriages, while "survivor" in the Maintenance Act should be read to include surviving partners of polygynous Muslim marriages.

Judgment 
In the Constitutional Court, however, "spouse" was found not to be reasonably capable of being understood to include more than one partner in the context of a polygynous Muslim marriage. The words "or spouses," therefore, are henceforth to be read in after each use of the word "spouse" in the Act.

See also 
 South African family law

References

Cases 
 Hassam v Jacobs NO and Others 2009 (5) SA 572 (CC).

Statutes 
 Intestate Succession Act 81 of 1987.
 Maintenance of Surviving Spouses Act 27 of 1990.

Notes 

Constitutional Court of South Africa cases
2009 in South African law
2009 in case law
South African family case law
Law of succession in South Africa